Tod Machover (born November 24, 1953, in Mount Vernon, New York), is a composer and an innovator in the application of technology in music. He is the son of Wilma Machover, a pianist and Carl Machover, a computer scientist.

He was named Director of Musical Research at IRCAM in 1980. Joining the faculty at the new Media Laboratory of the Massachusetts Institute of Technology (MIT) in 1985, he became Professor of Music and Media and Director of the Experimental Media Facility. Currently Professor of Music and Media at the MIT Media Lab, he is head of the Lab's Hyperinstruments/Opera of the Future group and has been co-director of the Things That Think (TTT) and Toys of Tomorrow (TOT) consortia since 1995. In 2006, he was named visiting professor of composition at the Royal Academy of Music in London. He has composed significant works for Yo-Yo Ma, Joshua Bell, Matt Haimovitz, the Ying Quartet, the Boston Pops, the Los Angeles Philharmonic, Penn & Teller, and many others, as well as designed and implemented various interactive systems for performance by Peter Gabriel and Prince. Machover gave a keynote lecture at NIME-02, the second international conference on New Interfaces for Musical Expression, which was held in 2002 at the former Media Lab Europe in Dublin, Ireland, and is a frequent lecturer worldwide. Machover is a Finalist for the 2012 Pulitzer Prize in Music for his opera "Death and the Powers."

Education
He attended the University of California at Santa Cruz in 1971 and received a BM and MM from the Juilliard School in New York where he studied with Elliott Carter and Roger Sessions (1973–1978). He also started his Doctoral studies at Juilliard before being invited as Composer-in-Residence to Pierre Boulez's new Institut de Recherche et Coordination Acoustique/Musique (IRCAM) in 1978.

History
In the fall of 1978, Tod Machover arrived at IRCAM in Paris, and was introduced to Giuseppe di Giugno's digital synthesizer 4 series. Light was premiered at the Metz Festival in November 1979 using 4C, the brain-child of di Giugno's concept that "synthesizers should be made for musicians, not for the people that make them." (Electric Sound, p. 181). In 1981 he composed Fusione Fugace for solo performance on a real-time digital synthesizer, called the 4X machine. At IRCAM 1986 and 1987 he was motivated to score for keyboard and percussion duet with emphasis on extending their performance into many complex sound layers. He composed Valis, again using di Giugno's 4X system to process voices. This desire to enhance the human performance foreshadowed his concept of the hyperinstrument (term coined in 1986). At MIT's Media Lab, he developed methods for taking many more sophisticated measurements of the instrument as well as the performer's expression. He focused on augmenting keyboard instruments, percussion, strings, even the act of conducting, with the goal of developing and implementing new technology in order to expand the function of the musical instruments and their performers. He propelled forward-thinking research in the field of musical performance and interaction using new musical and technological resources. Originally concentrated to the enhancement of virtuosic performance, research has expanded in a direction of building sophisticated interactive musical instruments for non-professional musicians, children, and the general public. He premiered 'Brain Opera' in 1996, an interactive music experience with hyper instruments that aimed at making every human being into a musician.

Hyperinstruments

Hyperviolin
Basically an electric violin, audio output provides raw material for real-time timbre analysis and synthesis techniques. Coupled with an enhanced bow (see Hyperbow), measured properties of both the audio output of the instrument and the bowing gesture of the player create data which controls aspects of the resulting amplified sound.

Hypercello
In addition to bow pressure and string contact, wrist measurements and left-hand fingering-position indicators create measurements which are evaluated and processed in response to the performance.

Hyperbow

Bowing parameters (speed, force, position) are measured and data is processed to create an interaction between performance properties and audio output. Different types or styles of bowing create complex calculations which are conducive to the performance and manipulation of larger structures and compositional shapes.

Hyperpiano
MIDI data generated by performer on a Yamaha Disklavier is manipulated by various Max/MSP processes as accompaniment and augmentation of keyboard performance.

Stage works
 Valis: an opera in two parts (1987) (OCLC ) based on Philip K. Dick's novel VALIS
 Brain Opera (1996), an original, interactive musical experience that included contributions from both on-line participants and live audiences. It toured Europe, Asia, the United States and South America from 1996 to 1998 and was permanently installed at Vienna's House of Music in the spring of 2000. 
 Resurrection (1999 at Houston Grand Opera with Joyce DiDonato) (based on Leo Tolstoy's last novel) 
 Skellig (2008), an opera based on the novel of the same name by David Almond 
 Death and the Powers (2010), an opera with live electronics and robotics developed by the M.I.T. Media Lab. Libretto by Robert Pinsky Powers
 Schoenberg in Hollywood (2018), an opera with film and live electronics commissioned by the Boston Lyric Opera. Libretto by Simon Robson

Compositions

 Ye Gentle Birds (1979) for soprano, mezzo-soprano and wind ensemble
 Fresh Spring (1977) for baritone solo and large chamber ensemble
 With Dadaji in Paradise (1977-'78, rev. 1983) for solo cello
 Two Songs (1978) for soprano and chamber ensemble
 Concerto for Amplified Guitar (1978) for amplified acoustic guitar and large chamber ensemble
 Deplacements (1979) for amplified guitar and computer-generated tape
 Light (1979) for chamber orchestra and computer electronics
 Soft Morning, City! for soprano, double bass, and computer-generated tape
 Winter Variations (1981) for large chamber ensemble
 String Quartet No. 1 (1981)
 Fusione Fugace (1981-'82) for keyboard, two specialized interfaces, and live 4X digital synthesizer
 Chansons d'Amour (1982) for solo piano
 Electric Etudes (1983) for amplified cello, live and pre-recorded computer electronics
 Spectres Parisiens (1983-'84) for flute, horn, cello, chamber orchestra and computer electronics
 Hidden Sparks (1984) for solo violin
 Famine (1985) for four amplified voices and computer-generated sounds
 Desires (1985-'89) for symphony orchestra
 Nature's Breath (1988-'89) for chamber orchestra
 Towards the Center (1988-'89) for amplified flute, clarinet, violin, cello, electronic keyboard and percussion, with five hyperinstrument electronics
 Flora (1989) for pre-recorded soprano and computer-generated sound
 Bug Mudra (1989-'90) for two guitars (electric and amplified-acoustic), electronic percussion, conducting dataglove, and interactive computer electronics
 Begin Again Again … (1991) for Yo-Yo Ma and hypercello Hyperstring Trilogy
 "Song of Penance" (1992) for hyperviola and chamber orchestra Hyperstring Trilogy
 "Forever and Ever" (1993) for hyperviolin and orchestra Hyperstring Trilogy
 Hyperstring Trilogy (1991-'93, rev. 1996-'97) for hypercello, hyperviola, hyperviolin and chamber orchestra Hyperstring Trilogy
 Bounce (1992) for hyperkeyboards, Yamaha Disklavier Grand piano and interactive computer electronics
 He's Our Dad (1997) for soprano, keyboard and computer-generated sound
 Meteor Music (1998) interactive installation Meteorite Museum
 "Sparkler" (2001) for orchestra and interactive computer electronics Sparkler
 "Toy Symphony" (2002/3) for hyperviolin Children's Chorus, Music Toys, and Orchestra Toy Symphony
 "Mixed Messiah" (2004), a 6-minute remix of Handel's Messiah Mixed Messiah
 "I Dreamt A Dream" (2004) for youth chorus, piano and electronics 
 "Sea Soaring" (2005) for flute, electronics, and live audience interaction Music Garden
 ...but not simpler... (2005) Not Simpler
 Jeux Deux (2005) for hyperpiano and orchestra Jeux Deux
 Another Life (2006) for nine instruments and electronics
 "VinylCello" (2007) for amplified cello, DJ and live computer electronics 
 "Spheres and Splinters" (2010) for hypercello, spatialized audio reproduction, and visuals Spheres and Splinters
 "Open up the House" (2013) for soprano and piano National Opera Center America
 A Toronto Symphony: Concerto for Composer and City (2013) for orchestra and electronics composed with the citizens of Toronto A Toronto Symphony
 Festival City (2013) for orchestra and electronics composed with the public for the Edinburgh International Festival
 Between the Desert and the Deep Blue Sea: A Symphony for Perth (2014) for orchestra and electronics composed with the public for the Perth International Arts Festival
 Breathless (2014) for flute, orchestra and electronics Bemidji Symphony Orchestra
 Time and Space (2015) for orchestra, inspired by the essays of Michel de Montaigne
 A Symphony for Our Times (2015) for live piano and recorded orchestra and electronics, for the closing performance of the World Economic Forum Annual Meeting in 2015
 Restructures (2015) for two pianos and electronics, tribute to Pierre Boulez premiered at the 2015 Lucerne Festival
 Eine Sinfonie für Luzern (2015) for orchestra and electronics, created with the public for the 2015 Lucerne Festival
 Fensadense (2015) for ten musicians and hyperinstruments with live electronics, premiered at the 2015 Lucerne Festivalra
 "Symphony in D" (2015) for orchestra, voice, additional performers and electronics, premiered by the Detroit Symphony
 "Philadelphia Voices" (2018) for four choirs, to be premiered by Westminster Choir College's Symphonic Choir at the Kimmel Center and Carnegie Hall.

Journal articles

Awards
 Chevalier de l'Ordre des Arts et des Lettres, France (1995)
 DigiGlobe Prize in Interactive Media, Germany (1998)
 Telluride Tech Festival Award of Technology and the Ray Kurzweil Award of Technology in Music, USA (2003)
 Charles Steinmetz Prize from IEEE and Union College, "USA" (2007)
 Pulitzer Prize in Music Finalist for "Death and the Powers" (2012) 
 Kennedy Center for the Performing Arts Award for Arts Advocacy (2013)
 2016 Composer of the Year, Musical America

References

External links

 Web page
 Faculty profile
 Research & Projects
 Opera of the Future Blog
 NewMusicBox
 Shaping Minds Musically
 Music-Making for All
 CNN Video Documentary 1/07
 "My Cello" by Tod Machover in Sherry Turkle's book, Evocative Objects: Things We Think With, MIT Press 2007. 
 Tod Machover Playlist Appearance on WMBR's Dinnertime Sampler radio show April 16, 2003
 
 "Inventing instruments that unlock new music" (TED2008)
 Toy Story: An MIT Project Helps Musical Novices Express Themselves article in Andante (online magazine), September 5, 2002 (archived 2007)
 

1953 births
20th-century classical composers
21st-century American composers
21st-century classical composers
Academics of the Royal Academy of Music
American classical composers
American male classical composers
American opera composers
Living people
Male opera composers
MIT Media Lab people
20th-century American composers
20th-century American male musicians
21st-century American male musicians